Amaxia apyga is a moth of the family Erebidae. It was described by George Hampson in 1901. It is found in Costa Rica.

References

Moths described in 1901
Amaxia
Moths of Central America